Endoxyla amphiplecta is a species of moth of the family Cossidae. It is found in Australia, where it has been recorded from Queensland, New South Wales and Victoria.

The wingspan of the males is about 50 mm. Females have reduced wings and are incapable of flight. The male forewings have a pattern of light and dark fawn.

The larvae have been recorded feeding on the roots of Pachycornia triandra and Bassia hyssopifolia.

References

Moths described in 1932
Endoxyla (moth)